DMA may refer to:

Arts
 DMA (magazine), a defunct dance music magazine
 Dallas Museum of Art, an art museum in Texas, US
 Danish Music Awards, an award show held in Denmark
 BT Digital Music Awards, an annual event in the UK
 Doctor of Musical Arts, a degree
 Detroit Music Awards, an award show held in Michigan, US
 DMA's, an Australian alternative rock band

Organisations
 DMA Design, now Rockstar North, a video game developer in Edinburgh, Scotland
 Danish Medical Association
 Derbyshire Miners' Association, England
 Data & Marketing Association, formerly Direct Marketing Association
Durham Miners' Association, a trade union

Education
 DMA eV, an academic association for German and Moroccan graduates in Hanover, Germany
 Delaware Military Academy, US
 Digital Media Academy, US

Government and military
 Davis–Monthan Air Force Base (IATA airport code), near Tucson, Arizona, US
 Defense Mapping Agency, a former agency of the US Department of Defense
 Defense Media Activity, an organization of the US Department of Defense
 Department of Military Affairs, India

Places
 Dominica (IOC code) 
 Dublin Metropolitan Area, an Irish jurisdiction

Science and technology
 Dynamic mechanical analysis of a polymer's viscoelasticity

Chemistry
 Delmadinone acetate, a progestin and antigonadotropin used as an antiandrogen
 Dimethandrolone, an anabolic–androgenic steroid
 Dimethoxyamphetamine, a psychedelic phenethylamine
 Dimethylacetamide, an organic solvent
 Dimethylamine
 Dimethylaniline
 Distributed multipole analysis, a method describing the charge distribution of a molecule
 Dimethylarsinic acid

Computing
 Direct memory access
 Dynamic Memory Allocation
 Disney Movies Anywhere
 Dynamic Microprocessor Associates, developer of pcAnywhere

Other uses
 Designated Market Area, a region where the population can receive the same media offerings
Digital Markets Act, an upcoming legislative proposal announced by the European Commission
 Direct market access, used in financial markets
Peugeot DMA, a historical light van and pickup truck